Live at Chene Park is a live album by French jazz fusion artist Jean-Luc Ponty, released in 1996.

Track listing 
All songs by Jean-Luc Ponty.
 "Introduction" – 0:48
 "Infinite Pursuit" – 7:47
 "Tender Memories" – 7:12
 "Between Sea and Sky" – 5:50
 "Caracas" – 6:36
 "Faith in You" – 5:14
 "After the Storm" – 7:08
 "The Gift of Time" – 6:05
 "Eulogy for Oscar Romero" – 2:53
 "The Amazon Forest" – 4:21
 "The Story Teller" – 4:28
 "Elephants in Love" – 5:31
 "A Journey's End" – 5:56

Personnel 
Jean-Luc Ponty – violin
Jamie Glaser – guitar
Chris Rhyne – piano, keyboards
Baron Browne – bass guitar
Michael Barsimanto – drums

Charts

References

Jean-Luc Ponty live albums
1997 live albums
Atlantic Records live albums